Karvansara (also Romanized as Kārvānsarā; also known as Kārvānsarā-ye Shāh ‘Abbāsī and Qal‘eh-ye Shāh ‘Abbāsī) is a village in Amanabad Rural District, in the Central District of Arak County, Markazi Province, Iran. At the 2006 census, its population was 21, in 8 families.

References 

Populated places in Arak County